Theeyur  is a village in the  
Avadaiyarkoilrevenue block of Pudukkottai district, Tamil Nadu, India.

Demographics 

As per the 2001 census, Theeyur had a total population of 201 with 92 males and 109 females. Out of the total population 127 people were literate.

References

Villages in Pudukkottai district